Flowers for Mrs Harris is a musical with a book by Rachel Wagstaff and music and lyrics by Richard Taylor. It is based on the 1958 American novel Mrs. 'Arris Goes to Paris by Paul Gallico, which was released as Flowers for Mrs Harris in the United Kingdom.

Productions

Sheffield (2016) 
The musical made its world premiere at the Crucible Theatre, Sheffield opening 18 May running until 4 June 2016. The production was directed by Daniel Evans, designed by Lez Brotherston, lighting designed by Mark Henderson with Tom Brady as musical director. The cast featured Clare Burt in the title role of Mrs Harris.

During the run in Sheffield, the production won 3 2016 UK Theatre Awards for Best Design (Lez Brotherston), Best Performer in a Musical (Clare Burt) and Best Musical Production, the first and last of these awards shared with the Sheffield Theatres production of Show Boat.

Chichester (2018) 
The musical was revived at the Chichester Festival Theatre from 8 to 29 September 2018. The production featured the same creative team as the Sheffield production including Daniel Evans as director, and the cast featured Clare Burt reprising her role as Mrs Harris.

During the COVID-19 pandemic, an archive recording of the musical during its run in Chichester was streamed online from 9 April 2020 for 30 days.

Cast Recording 
The complete 2018 Chichester Festival Theatre cast and orchestra reassembled over 3 days in July 2020 to record the score. The recording took place on stage at the Festival Theatre, due to the COVID-19 pandemic making it impossible to record in a studio, whereas the Festival Theatre stage was large enough to accommodate full cast and band, sufficiently distanced. It was conducted by Tom Brady, recording engineer was Mike Walker, and it was produced by Richard Taylor and Mike Walker.

Ostrava (2020) 
The first foreign production of the musical is the Czech production in National Moravian-Silesian Theatre in Ostrava. It is translated by Hana Nováková and directed by Gabriela Petráková. The premiere took place on 3 October 2020 with Hana Fialová in the main role. Hana Fialová won the 2022 Thalia Award in the music-dramatic genre for her outstanding performance in the main role.

Cast and characters

References 

2016 musicals
Musicals based on novels
British musicals
Adaptations of works by Paul Gallico